HMS Dumbarton Castle (K388) was one of 44 s built for the Royal Navy during World War II. She saw action in the Battle of the Atlantic during the war.

Design and description
The Castle-class corvette was a stretched version of the preceding Flower class, enlarged to improve seakeeping and to accommodate modern weapons. They were powered by a pair of triple-expansion steam engines, each driving one propeller shaft using steam provided by two Admiralty three-drum boilers. The ships' complement was 99 officers and ratings.

The Castle-class ships were equipped with a single QF  Mk XVI gun forward, but their primary weapon was their single three-barrel Squid anti-submarine mortar. This was backed up by one depth charge rail and two throwers for 15 depth charges. The ships were fitted with two twin and a pair of single mounts for  Oerlikon light AA guns. Provision was made for a further four single mounts if needed. They were equipped with Type 145Q and Type 147B ASDIC sets to detect submarines by reflections from sound waves beamed into the water. A Type 277 search radar and a HF/DF radio direction finder rounded out the Castles' sensor suite.

Construction and career
Dumbarton Castle was laid down by Caledon Shipbuilding & Engineering Company at their shipyard in Dundee on 6 May 1943 and launched on 28 September. She was completed on 25 February 1944 and served as a convoy escort until the end of the war in May 1945. The ship was placed in reserve April 1946. Dumbarton Castle was sold for scrap on 16 November 1960 and arrived at Gateshead in March 1961 to be broken up.

Citations

Bibliography
 
 
 
 
 

 

Castle-class corvettes
1943 ships
Ships built in Dundee